William Whateley may refer to:

 William Whately (1583–1639), English Puritan cleric and author.
 William Whateley (barrister) (1794–1862), English barrister